Charlie Pasarell and Sherwood Stewart won in the final 6-4, 6-4 against Tom Edlefsen and Manuel Orantes.

Seeds

Draw

Finals

Top half

Bottom half

References 
1974 American Airlines Tennis Games Draw - Men's Doubles

1974 American Airlines Tennis Games